Kiksuch (also Romanized as Kīksūch; also known as Keksūch) is a village in Bahu Kalat Rural District, Dashtiari District, Chabahar County, Sistan and Baluchestan Province, Iran. At the 2006 census, its population was 1,612, in 289 families.

References 

Populated places in Dashtiari County